"Te Quise Tanto" is a song written by Coti Sorokin, Andahí and A. Schinoff and produced by Emilio Estefan Jr. and recorded by Mexican pop singer Paulina Rubio, and was included on her studio album Pau-Latina (2004).

The track was selected as the lead single from the album, and was released in December 2003 in North America, Latin America and Spain (see 2004 in music). It reached the number one position in Argentina, Spain, Venezuela and in the Billboard Hot Latin Tracks chart in the United States for six non-consecutive weeks, the longest stay at the summit by the singer in that chart to date.

Promotion
Paulina performed the song at the 2004 Latin Billboard Awards.

Chart performance
In the United States, "Te Quise Tanto" becoming  Rubio's first number one single on the Billboard Hot Latin Tracks chart; it spent a total of six weeks at the top position, while also reaching number one on the Latin Pop Airplay. The song managed to peak at number five on the Bubbling Under Hot 100 chart. Also, as of December 11 of 2009, "Te Quise Tanto" became the 72nd most played song of the past decade amongst the top 100 most popular songs from Billboards, Latin Pop Songs charts. The song peaked within the top 5 on singles charts of Colombia (2), Chile (5) and Venezuela (2).

Music video 
A music video was shot by Gustavo Garzón. The clip has a cartoonish aesthetic, psychedelic figures and Rubio's timeless glamor.

Formats and track listing
These are the formats and track listings of major single releases of "Te Quise Tanto".

Mexico CD single
Te Quise Tanto (Radio Edit)
Te Quise Tanto (Original Version)

USA 12" promo
Te Quise Tanto (DJ Hessler 3AM Extended Mix)
Te Quise Tanto (DJ Hessler 4AM Disco Extended Mix)
Te Quise Tanto (DJ Hessler Trance Extended Mix)
Te Quise Tanto (D'Menace Club Mix)
Te Quise Tanto (Salsa Mix)

Charts

Weekly charts

Year-end charts

See also
List of number-one Billboard Hot Latin Tracks of 2004

References

2004 singles
Paulina Rubio songs
Spanish-language songs
Songs written by Coti
Universal Music Latino singles
2004 songs
Song recordings produced by Emilio Estefan